Sammy Stewart (born 9 March 1969) is a Liberian boxer. He competed in the men's light flyweight event at the 1988 Summer Olympics.

References

1969 births
Living people
Liberian male boxers
Olympic boxers of Liberia
Boxers at the 1988 Summer Olympics
Sportspeople from Monrovia
Light-flyweight boxers